Shining Brow is an English language opera by the American composer Daron Hagen, first performed by the Madison Opera in Madison, Wisconsin, April 21, 1993. The libretto is by Paul Muldoon, and is based on a treatment co-written with the composer. The story concerns events in the life of architect Frank Lloyd Wright. Hagen invited Muldoon to write the libretto while the two were both in residency at the MacDowell Colony, in Peterborough, New Hampshire during the summer of 1989.

Name
The opera's title, Shining Brow, comes from the Welsh Taliesin, the name of Wright's homes in Wisconsin and Arizona.

Performance history
The opera received its world premiere on 21 April 1993 from the Madison Opera, Wisconsin. The production was broadcast live statewide and subsequently broadcast twice on NPR's World of Opera.

A first chamber opera version ("Fallingwater") was premiered by the Opera Theater of Pittsburgh on 7 June 2013, at Fallingwater, Mill Run, Pennsylvania, and a second chamber version ("Usonian") on 14 October 2017 by UrbanArias in Arlington, DC. For Arizona Opera's commissioned "Taliesin West Version" in 2019, the composer streamlined the score and libretto, folding all of the secondary roles into the chorus, cutting twenty minutes of music, and eliminating the interval, resulting in a 90-minute run-time. In addition, at the suggestion of stage director Chas Rader-Shieber, Hagen eliminated the female choristers.

Roles

Synopsis
The action takes place in Chicago, Illinois, at Taliesin, Frank Lloyd Wright's home and studio in Spring Green, Wisconsin, and in Berlin, Germany, between 1903 and 1914.

Prologue

The Cliff Dwellers Club, Chicago, 1903. Architect Louis Sullivan, mentor and friend of Frank Lloyd Wright, has been drinking all afternoon. He muses on his estrangement from Wright.

Act One

Wright's studio, Oak Park, Illinois, 1903. Wright pitches plans for a new house to wealthy Chicagoans Edwin and Mamah Cheney. He and Mamah flirt; her husband is concerned with costs. After they leave, Wright muses on Mamah; his wife Catherine overhears him and they quarrel.

The Cheney House construction site, six months later. Workmen sing, townswomen gossip; Wright and Mamah arrive to view the work as their liaison deepens. Edwin arrives and there is a showdown: Mamah tells Edwin she is leaving him for Wright. Afterwards, Edwin laments the fact that, while he has gained a house, he has lost his wife.

Mamah's apartment in Berlin, 1910. As Mamah translates some verses from German, she comes to terms with her strongly ambivalent feelings about her life with Wright, recognizing, despite her love for him, that her dream of an equal partnership with him is and will remain just that. Sullivan, in Chicago, echoes the sentiment.

Act Two

Taliesin, Spring Green, Christmas, 1911. Wright delivers a prepared statement attempting to explain his living out of wedlock with Mamah while still married to Catherine. Mamah, though at his side, is clearly disaffected.

Taliesin, Summer, 1914. During the course of a cocktail party, Wright pursues a new love interest as Mamah cannot help but observe; various clients, guests, colleagues, and employees — including an inebriated barbershop quartet of newspaper reporters — comment.

The Cliff Dwellers' Club, later that summer. Wright and Sullivan attempt a reconciliation, but are interrupted by Edwin Cheney, who delivers the news that Mamah's been murdered and Taliesin torched.

The ruins of Taliesin, later that night. The bodies of the dead are arrayed in the smoking remains of the house. A Maid explains that Julian Carleton, Wright's chef, has been found, his throat burned from drinking hydrochloric acid. Wright gropes for a way to go on, finds in the pocket of Mamah's coat a letter that gives him consolation of a sort. He vows to rebuild the house in her memory.

Recordings
 Premiere Recording by the Buffalo Philharmonic

References

External links
Shining Brow official website''

English-language operas
Operas by Daron Hagen
Operas
1993 operas
Operas set in the United States
Operas set in the 20th century
Operas based on real people
Cultural depictions of Frank Lloyd Wright